Fairfield County is a county located in the U.S. state of Ohio. As of the 2020 census, the population was 158,921. Its county seat and largest city is Lancaster. Its name is a reference to the Fairfield area of the original Lancaster.

Fairfield County is part of the Columbus, OH Metropolitan Statistical Area.

History
Fairfield County originally encompassed all or parts of  Knox, Hocking, Licking, Perry, and Pickaway Counties. Fairfield is a descriptive name referring to the beauty of their fields.

Geography

Fairfield County sits just on the edge of Ohio's Appalachian region. While the once-glaciated northern portion of the county is fairly flat, as one travels south along U.S. 33 one can easily recognize the foothills of a mountainous region beginning around the village of Carroll. Although not officially part of the state or federal definition of Appalachia, certain areas of Fairfield County—particularly south of U.S. 22—bear a distinctly Appalachian feel in both physical geography and demographics.

The scenic Hocking Hills region lies immediately to the south, mostly in neighboring Hocking County. A large portion of Buckeye Lake is located in northeastern Fairfield County.

Mudhouse Mansion, an alleged haunted house, was located in the county.

Adjacent counties
 Licking County (north)
 Perry County (east)
 Hocking County (south)
 Pickaway County (southwest)
 Franklin County (northwest)

Demographics

2000 census
As of the census of 2010, there were 146,156 people, 54,310 households, and 39,846 families living in the county. The population density was 289 people per square mile (111/km2). There were 58,678 housing units at an average density of 116 per square mile (44/km2). The racial makeup of the county was 90.02% White, 6.00% Black or African American, 0.20% Native American, 1.10% Asian, 0.00% Pacific Islander, 0.23% from other races, and 1.90% from two or more races. 1.70% of the population were Hispanic or Latino of any race.

There were 54,310 households, out of which 34.10% had children under the age of 18 living with them, 57.30% were married couples living together, 11.20% had a female householder with no husband present, and 26.60% were non-families. 21.90% of all households were made up of individuals, and 8.40% had someone living alone who was 65 years of age or older. The average household size was 2.64 and the average family size was 3.07.

In the county, the population was spread out, with 26.30% under the age of 18, 8.00% from 18 to 24, 30.20% from 25 to 44, 23.90% from 45 to 64, and 12.40% who were 65 years of age or older. The median age was 38.2 years. For every 100 females, there were 99.20 males. For every 100 females age 18 and over, there were 96.30 males.

The median income for a household in the county was $47,962, and the median income for a family was $55,539. Males had a median income of $39,566 versus $27,353 for females. The per capita income for the county was $21,671. About 4.50% of families and 5.90% of the population were below the poverty line, including 7.40% of those under age 18 and 6.20% of those age 65 or over.

2010 census
As of the 2010 United States Census, there were 146,156 people, 54,310 households, and 39,846 families living in the county. The racial makeup of the county was 90.2% white, 6.0% black or African American, 1.1% Asian, 0.2% American Indian, 0.6% from other races, and 1.9% from two or more races. Those of Hispanic or Latino origin made up 1.7% of the population. In terms of ancestry, 31.2% were German, 16.2% were Irish, 11.7% were English, 8.6% were American, and 5.2% were Italian.

Of the 54,310 households, 37.3% had children under the age of 18 living with them, 57.3% were married couples living together, 11.2% had a female householder with no husband present, 26.6% were non-families, and 21.9% of all households were made up of individuals. The average household size was 2.64 and the average family size was 3.07. The median age was 38.2 years.

The median income for a household in the county was $56,796 and the median income for a family was $65,835. Males had a median income of $49,314 versus $37,209 for females. The per capita income for the county was $26,130. About 7.5% of families and 10.4% of the population were below the poverty line, including 14.7% of those under age 18 and 6.7% of those age 65 or over.

Politics

|}

Prior to 1944, Fairfield County was Democratic in presidential elections, only voting for Republicans twice from 1856 to 1940. Starting with the 1944 election, the county has become a Republican stronghold in presidential elections, with Lyndon B. Johnson being the only Democrat to win since then, but Harry S. Truman came within 96 votes of winning it in 1948.

Government

Roster of County Officials (as of Feb. 2019):
 Commissioners: David L. Levacy (R), Steve Davis (R), Jeffrey Fix (R)
 Prosecutor: Kyle Witt (R)
 Sheriff: Alex Lape (R)
 Auditor: Jon A. Slater Jr. (R)
 Treasurer: James Bahnsen, CPA (R)
 Recorder: Lisa R. McKenzie (R)
 Clerk of Courts: Branden Meyer (R)
 Engineer: Jeremiah Upp (R)
 Coroner: Dr. L. Brian Varney, M.D. (R)
 Judge, Common Pleas Court: David A. Trimmer (R)
 Judge, Common Pleas Court: Richard Berens (R)
 Judge, Common Pleas Court (General/Domestic Relations): Laura B. Smith  (R)
 Judge, Common Pleas Court (Juvenile/Probate): Terre L. Vandervoort (R)

Education

School districts and state schools
School districts include:

 Amanda-Clearcreek Local School District
 Berne Union Local School District
 Bloom-Carroll Local School District
 Canal Winchester Local School District (Franklin & Fairfield)
 Fairfield Union Local School District
 Lancaster City School District
 Liberty Union-Thurston Local School District
 Northern Local School District
 Pickerington Local School District 
 Reynoldsburg City School District
 Southwest Licking Local School District
 Teays Valley Local School District (Almost entirely Pickaway)
 Walnut Township Local School District

Elementary schools
 St. Mary's School
 St. Bernadette School
 Mount Pleasant Elementary
 Medill Elementary (housed at former East Elementary location during reconstruction)
 Sanderson Elementary (to be closed upon completion of Medill Elementary reconstruction)
 Tallmadge Elementary (housed at former West Elementary location during reconstruction)
 Tarhe Trails Elementary
 Gorsuch West Elementary
 Pleasantville Elementary
 Bremen Elementary

High schools
 Amanda-Clearcreek Digital Academy
 Amanda-Clearcreek High School
 Liberty Union High School
 Bloom-Carroll High School
 Fairfield Career Center
 Fairfield Christian Academy 
 Fairfield Union High School
 Lancaster Fairfield Alternative School
 Lancaster High School
 Millersport Jr/Sr High School
 Walnut Township Academy
 Pickerington Alternative School
 Pickerington High School Central
 Pickerington High School North
 Berne Union High School
 William V. Fisher Catholic High School

Communities

Cities
 Columbus (mostly in Franklin County and partly in Delaware County)
 Lancaster (county seat)
 Pickerington
 Reynoldsburg
 Canal Winchester

Villages

 Amanda
 Baltimore
 Bremen
 Buckeye Lake
 Carroll
 Lithopolis
 Millersport
 Pleasantville
 Rushville
 Stoutsville
 Sugar Grove
 Tarlton
 Thurston
 West Rushville

Townships

 Amanda
 Berne
 Bloom
 Clearcreek
 Greenfield
 Hocking
 Liberty
 Madison
 Pleasant
 Richland
 Rush Creek
 Violet
 Walnut

Census-designated places
 Fairfield Beach
 Hide-A-Way Hills

Unincorporated communities

 Cedar Hill
 Clearport
 Colfax
 Delmont
 Drinkle
 Dumontsville
 Geneva
 Greencastle
 Hamburg
 Havensport
 Hooker
 Horns Mill
 Jefferson
 Lockville
 Marcy
 New Salem
 North Berne
 Oakland
 Oakthorpe
 Revenge
 Royalton
 Waterloo

Source:

See also
 National Register of Historic Places listings in Fairfield County, Ohio

References

External links
 Fairfield County Government's website
 Fairfield County Visitors & Convention Bureau
 Lancaster-Fairfield County Annual July 4 Celebration